Anders Torstensson (born 19 February 1966) is a Swedish football manager. His current position is manager of Mjällby AIF.

References

Living people
Swedish footballers
Mjällby AIF managers
Association footballers not categorized by position
Swedish football managers
1966 births